St. Louis Blues is a 1929 American two-reel short film starring Bessie Smith. The early sound film features Smith in an African-American speakeasy of the prohibition era singing the W. C. Handy standard, "St. Louis Blues".  Directed by Dudley Murphy, it is the only known film of Bessie Smith, and the soundtrack is her only recording not controlled by Columbia Records.

Bessie Smith had a hit on the song in 1925 and Handy himself asked Bessie Smith to appear in the movie.  Handy co-authored the film and was the musical director. The film was a dramatization of the song, a woman left alone by her roving man.  It features a band that included James P. Johnson on piano, Thomas Morris and Joe Smith on cornet, Bernard Addison on guitar and banjo, as well as the Hall Johnson Choir with some thrilling harmonies at the end.

The film has an all African-American cast. Bessie Smith co-stars with Jimmy Mordecai as the boyfriend and Isabel Washington as the other woman.

It was filmed in June 1929 in Astoria, Queens. The film is about 16 minutes long. In 2006, this version was selected for preservation in the United States National Film Registry by the Library of Congress as being "culturally, historically, or aesthetically significant".

The film was rumored for a long time to have been banned as demeaning and to have become lost. Neither rumor was true, but when a print was found in Mexico in the mid-1940s, the event was treated as a significant development, even though copies had, in fact, been available elsewhere. "In 1950, a group of white liberals petitioned the NAACP to buy and destroy the print found in Mexico, which they believed to be the only copy extant."

Cast
 Bessie Smith as herself
 Hall Johnson Choir as Themselves
 James P. Johnson as Pianist (uncredited)
 Alec Lovejoy as Bit Role (uncredited)
 Jimmy Mordecai as Jimmy the Pimp (uncredited)
 Thomas Morris as Cornetist (uncredited)
 Isabel Washington (uncredited)
 Bernard Addison as Plectrist (uncredited)

References

External links
St. Louis Blues essay  by Mark Cantor at National Film Registry 

Bessie Smith's St. Louis Blues (1929 film) at the Red Hot Jazz Archive
St. Louis Blues essay by Daniel Eagan in America's Film Legacy: The Authoritative Guide to the Landmark Movies in the National Film Registry, A&C Black, 2010 , pages 161-162 

1929 films
1929 short films
1929 drama films
1920s musical drama films
American musical drama films
American black-and-white films
African-American films
Articles containing video clips
Films directed by Dudley Murphy
United States National Film Registry films
1920s English-language films
1920s American films